Castor Town was a community in Hillsborough County, Florida, United States on Egmont Key and had 20 buildings in the early 1800s. The town was most likely centered on the fact that there was a fort for defense.

References

Former populated places in Florida
Hillsborough County, Florida